Podocin is a protein component of the filtration slits of podocytes. Glomerular capillary endothelial cells, the glomerular basement membrane and the filtration slits function as the filtration barrier of the kidney glomerulus.
Mutations in the podocin gene NPHS2 can cause nephrotic syndrome, such as focal segmental glomerulosclerosis (FSGS) or minimal change disease (MCD). Symptoms may develop in the first few months of life (congenital nephrotic syndrome) or later in childhood.

Structure
Podocin is a membrane protein of the band-7-stomatin family, consisting of 383 amino acids. It has a transmembrane domain forming a hairpin structure, with two cytoplasmic ends at the N- and C-terminus, the latter of which interacts with the cytosolic tail of nephrin, with CD2AP serving as an adaptor.

Function 
Podocin is localized on the membranes of podocyte pedicels (foot-like long processes), where it oligomerizes in lipid rafts together with nephrin to form the filtration slits.

References 

Proteins